Julian de Bruyn Kops (1862–1942) was an architect in Savannah, Georgia. Several of his works are listed on the National Register of Historic Places.

He was born in Spartanburg, South Carolina. He studied architecture and civil engineering at Lehigh and the University of Georgia. In 1892 he was the Assistant City Engineer in Savannah. By 1905 he was Savannah's superintendent of architecture. He died in Atlanta.

Work

Oglethorpe Bench (1906)
Camden County Courthouse (Georgia) (1928) NRHP listed
Carnegie Colored Library (1915) NRHP listed
Lawtonville Baptist Church (1911) in Estill, South Carolina NRHP listed

References

Further reading
Herringshaw's American Blue-Book of Biography; Prominent Americans

1862 births
1942 deaths
19th-century American architects
20th-century American architects
People from Spartanburg, South Carolina